Manuel Daffara (born 22 June 1989) is an Italian footballer who plays as a left-back for  club Virtus Verona.

Club career
Born in Milan, Lombardy, Daffara started his career at Palazzolo of the Province of Brescia, Lombardy.

AlbinoLeffe
In August 2007, he signed a youth contract with AlbinoLeffe of Province of Bergamo, Lombardy.

Daffara made his Serie B debut on 18 October 2008, replaced Roberto Previtali in the 68th minute, who received a caution a few minutes before. AlbinoLeffe eventually lost 0–4. He also finished as the losing side of the round 16 of the reserve league, as a forward.

In June 2009, he graduated from AlbinoLeffe's Primavera under-20 team and left for Lega Pro 2nd Divisione side Pavia. He played 23 league matches for the Lombardy side, and fulfill the requirement set by FIGC, which he now eligible to sign a contract of maximum of 5-year instead of 3 year in protection period. Daffara was the starting defender in the promotion playoffs. Despite the club lost 0–2 in aggregate, the club promoted to fill the vacancies.

On 29 July 2010, he signed a new 5-year contract for AlbinoLeffe along with youth products Alessandro Salvi and Enrico Geroni. His loan with Pavia also extended a weeks before.

Daffara returned to AlbinoLeffe for 2011–12 Serie B. He wore no.25 shirt for the first team. The club relegated in 2012.

On 31 August 2012 Daffara was signed by Nocerina of fellow third division. Daffara played both matches in the first round of promotion playoffs. Daffara and Vincenzo Pepe (midfielder) were substitutes for Vincenzo De Liguori (left midfielder) and Marco Chiosa (left-back) in the first game respectively in the 56th minute. in the second match Daffara was the right-back, with De Liguori was on the bench, being replaced by Desiderio Garufo who moved from right-back to right midfielder, as well as Francesco Corapi who moved from right to left midfielder.

Perugia
On 2 September 2013 he was signed by Perugia outright in 2-year contract. On 28 January 2014 he left for Portuguese club Beira-Mar along with former AlbinoLeffe team-mate Andrea Cocco.

Padova
On 15 July 2019, he signed with Padova.

Virtus Verona
On 31 January 2020, he joined Virtus Verona.

References

External links
 Football.it Profile 

1989 births
Living people
Footballers from Milan
Italian footballers
Association football fullbacks
Serie B players
Serie C players
U.C. AlbinoLeffe players
F.C. Pavia players
A.S.G. Nocerina players
A.C. Perugia Calcio players
U.S. Catanzaro 1929 players
Lupa Roma F.C. players
A.C. Ancona players
Siracusa Calcio players
Calcio Padova players
Virtus Verona players
Liga Portugal 2 players
S.C. Beira-Mar players
Italian expatriate footballers
Italian expatriate sportspeople in Portugal
Expatriate footballers in Portugal